Ehson Panjshanbe, is a Tajikistani footballer who plays for Istiklol and the Tajikistan national football team.

Career

Club
In June 2016, Panjshanbe returned to FC Istiklol after a loan spell with Barkchi.

On 31 August, FC Istiklol confirmed that Panjshanbe had moved to PFC Navbahor Namangan on a contract until the end of 2022.

In July 2022, Panjshanbe signed for Persian Gulf Pro League club Zob Ahan Esfahan.

On 9 February 2023, Istiklol announced the return of Panjshanbe.

International
Panjshanbe made his debut for Tajikistan on 2 June 2016 against Bangladesh.

Career statistics

Club

International

Statistics accurate as of match played 25 September 2022

Honours

Istiklol
 Tajik League (4): 2016, 2017, 2018 2019
 Tajik Cup: 2016, 2018, 2019
Tajik Supercup: 2019, 2020

Tajikistan
King's Cup: 2022

References

1999 births
Living people
Tajikistani footballers
Tajikistan international footballers
FC Istiklol players
Association football midfielders
Tajikistan Higher League players